Grovertown (also Grover Town or Grovestown) is an unincorporated community in southeastern Oregon Township, Starke County, in the U.S. state of Indiana.

History
Although Grovertown is unincorporated, it has a post office, with the ZIP code of 46531. The post office has been in operation since 1859. Grovertown was laid out in the year 1858. The Pittsburg, Ft. Wayne & Chicago Railroad runs through the village, which contains some two hundred inhabitants.

Geography
Grovertown lies along State Road 23 northeast of the city of Knox, the county seat of Starke County.  Its elevation is 725 feet (221 m), and it is located at  (41.3750434, -86.5047339).

References

Unincorporated communities in Starke County, Indiana
Unincorporated communities in Indiana